Henry Marie Joseph Frédéric Expedite Millon de Montherlant (20 April 1895 – 21 September 1972) was a French essayist, novelist, and dramatist.  He was elected to the Académie française in 1960.

Biography 
Born in Paris, a descendant of an aristocratic (yet obscure) Picard family, he was educated at the Lycée Janson de Sailly and the Sainte-Croix boarding school at Neuilly-sur-Seine. Henry's father was a hard-line reactionary (to the extent of despising the post-Dreyfus Affair army as too subservient to the Republic, and refusing to have electricity or the telephone installed in his house). His mother, a formerly lively socialite,  became chronically ill due to the difficult childbirth, being bedridden most of the time, and dying at the young age of 43.

From the age of seven or eight, Henry was enthusiastic about literature and began writing. In 1905 reading Quo Vadis by Henryk Sienkiewicz caused him a lifelong fascination with Ancient Rome and a proficient interest in Latin. He also was enthusiastic about school comradeship, sports and bullfighting. When he was 15 his parents sent him alone to Spain where he became initiated in the corrida, killing two young bulls. He was also a talented draughtsman and after 1913 resorted to hiring young people in the street for nude modelling.

On 5 April 1912, aged almost seventeen, Henry was expelled from the Catholic Sainte-Croix de Neuilly school for being a "corruptor of souls". Together with other five youngsters he had founded a group called 'La Famille' (the Family), a kind of order of chivalry whose members were bonded by an oath of fidelity and mutual assistance. A member of that group was Philippe Jean Giquel (1897–1977), Montherlant's two year junior "special friend", with whom he was madly in love although it never became physical. According to Montherlant this "special friendship" had raised the fierce and jealous opposition of abbé de La Serre, who managed to get the older boy expelled. This incident (and Giquel) became a lifelong obsession for Montherlant, who would depict it in the 1952 play La Ville dont le prince est un enfant and his 1969 novel Les Garçons. Later, in his adult years, he would resume his platonic friendship with Giquel, who would invite the writer to be the godfather of his daughter Marie-Christine.

After the deaths of his father and mother in 1914 and 1915, he went to live with his doting grandmother and eccentric uncles. Mobilised in 1916, he was wounded and decorated.  Marked by his experience of war, he wrote Songe ('Dream'), an autobiographic novel, as well as his Chant funèbre pour les morts de Verdun (Funeral Chant for the Dead at Verdun), both exaltations of heroism during the Great War. His work was part of the literature event in the art competition at the 1924 Summer Olympics.

Montherlant first achieved critical success with the 1934 novel Les Célibataires, and sold millions of copies of his tetralogy Les Jeunes Filles, written from 1936 through 1939.  In these years Montherlant, a well-to-do heir, traveled extensively, mainly to Spain (where he met and worked with bullfighter Juan Belmonte), Italy, and Algeria, giving vent to his passion of street boys. During the Second World War after the fall of France in 1940 he remained in Paris and continued to write plays, poems, essays, and worked as a war correspondent. At the height of his fame when the war broke out  (he had been awarded the Grand Prix by the prestigious Académie Française in 1934), he initially described the German victory as evidence of the superiority of a virile, conquering race. Still, after Liberation he was not treated as harshly as those who openly and enthusiastically collaborated; the Committee for the Purification of Writers sentenced him in 1945 to only to one year of abstinence from publishing.  In 1960, he was elected to a lifetime position at the Académie Française.

Some time in 1968, according to Roger Peyrefitte, outside a movie theatre in Paris, 72-year-old Montherlant was attacked and beaten up by a group of youths because he had groped the younger brother of one of them. Montherlant was seriously injured and blinded in one eye as a result.  The British writer Peter Quennell, who edited a collection of translations of his works, recalled that Montherlant attributed the eye injury to "a fall" instead; and mentions in confirmation that Montherlant suffered from vertigo.

After going almost blind in his later years and becoming the target of scorners like Peyrefitte, Montherlant died in 1972 from a self-inflicted gunshot wound to the head after swallowing a cyanide capsule.  His ashes were scattered by Jean-Claude Barat and Gabriel Matzneff in Rome, at the Forum, among the Temple of Portunus and into the Tiber.

His standard biography was written by Pierre Sipriot, and published in two volumes (1982 and 1990), revealing the full extent of Montherlant's sexual habits.

Works 
His early successes were works such as Les Célibataires (The Bachelors) in 1934, and the highly anti-feminist tetralogy Les Jeunes Filles (The Young Girls) (1936–1939), which sold millions of copies and was translated into 13 languages. His late novel Chaos and Night was published in 1963.  The novels were praised by writers as diverse as Aragon, Bernanos, and Malraux. Montherlant was well known for his anti-feminist and misogynistic views, as exemplified particularly in The Girls. Simone de Beauvoir considered his attitudes about women in detail in her The Second Sex.

He wrote plays such as Pasiphaé (1936), La Reine morte (1942, the first of a series of historical dramas), Malatesta (1946), Le Maître de Santiago (1947), Port-Royal (1954) and Le Cardinal d'Espagne (1960). He is particularly remembered as a playwright. In his plays as well as in his novels he frequently portrayed heroic characters displaying the moral standards he professed, and explored the 'irrationality and unpredictability of human behaviour'.

He worked as an essayist also. In the collection L'Equinoxe de septembre (1938) he deplored the mediocrity of contemporary France and in Le solstice de Juin, (1941), he expressed his admiration for Wehrmacht and claimed that France had been justly defeated and conquered in 1940. Like many scions of the old aristocracy, he had hated the Third Republic, especially as it had become in the aftermath of the Dreyfus Affair.  He was in a "round-table" of French and German intellectuals who met at the Georges V Hotel in Paris in the 1940s, including, the writers Ernst Jünger, Paul Morand and Jean Cocteau, the publisher Gaston Gallimard and the Nazi legal scholar Carl Schmitt. Montherlant wrote articles for the Paris weekly, La Gerbe, directed by the pro-Nazi novelist and Catholic reactionary Alphonse de Châteaubriant.  After the war, he was thus viewed as a collaborationist, and was punished by a one-year restriction on publishing.

A closeted pederast, Montherlant treated pederastic themes in his work, including his play La Ville dont le prince est un enfant (1952) and novel Les Garçons (The Boys), published in 1969 but written four or five decades earlier. He maintained a private and coded correspondence with fellow pederast Roger Peyrefitte — author of Les Amitiés particulières (Special Friendships, 1943), also about relationships between boys at a Roman Catholic boarding school. Peyrefitte would later mercilessly mock Montherlant and disclose his pederasty in his 1970 novel Des Français (under the alias "Lionel de Beauséant") and in his memoirs Propos secrets (1977).

Montherlant is remembered for his aphorism "Happiness writes in white ink on a white page", often quoted in the shorter form "Happiness writes white".

Honours and awards 
Les célibataires was awarded the Grand prix de littérature de l'Académie française in 1934, and the English Northcliffe Prize. In 1960 Montherlant was elected a member of the Académie française, taking the seat which had belonged to André Siegfried, a political writer.   He was an Officer of the French Ordre national de la Légion d'honneur.

Reference is made to "Les Jeunes Filles" in two films by West German director Rainer Werner Fassbinder: Das kleine Chaos (1967) and Satansbraten (1977). In the short film Das kleine Chaos the character portrayed by Fassbinder himself reads aloud from a paperback German translation of Les Jeunes Filles which he claims to have stolen.

Translations and adaptations 
[[Image:R Delaunay La Relève du matin.jpg|thumb|right|180px| Lithograph by Robert Delaunay for an edition of La Relève du matin
(1928)]]

Terence Kilmartin, best known for revising the Moncrieff translation of Proust, translated some of Montherlant's novels into English, including a 1968 edition of the four volumes of Les Jeunes Filles, in English called simply The Girls.

In 2009, New York Review Books returned Montherlant to print in English by issuing Kilmartin's translation of Chaos and Night (1963) with a new introduction by Gary Indiana.

Christophe Malavoy directed and starred in a 1997 television movie adaption of La Ville dont le prince est un enfant.

 Illustrated works 
Some works of Henry de Montherlant were published in illustrated editions, today commanding high prices at book auctions and in book specialists. Examples include "Pasiphaé," illustrated by Henri Matisse, "Les Jeunes Filles", illustrated by Mariette Lydis, and others illustrated by Jean Cocteau, Robert Cami, Édouard Georges Mac-Avoy and Pierre-Yves Tremois.

 References 

 Further reading 
H. Perruchot - Montherlant (French and European Publications ), 1963
J. Cruikshank - Montherlant'' (Oliver & Boyd ), 1964
I. Hedges, Staging History from the Shoah to Palestine:  Three Plays and Essays on WWII and its Aftermath (ISBN 978-3-030-84009-9), 2021, pp. 80–81.

External links 

 
 Henry de Montherlant site

1895 births
1972 suicides
20th-century French dramatists and playwrights
20th-century French novelists
French male dramatists and playwrights
French male novelists
French military personnel of World War I
French untitled nobility
French LGBT dramatists and playwrights
French LGBT novelists
Lycée Janson-de-Sailly alumni
French male essayists
Members of the Académie Française
Officiers of the Légion d'honneur
Pedophile advocacy
Suicides by firearm in France
Writers from Paris
20th-century French essayists
20th-century French male writers
Olympic competitors in art competitions
War correspondents of World War II
French war correspondents
Victims of anti-LGBT hate crimes
1972 deaths
20th-century French LGBT people